Gusums Bruk was a foundry in Gusum, Sweden that specialized in brass production. The foundry commenced operations in 1653.  Light crowns and industrial products were the foundries main production. Cannons, copper and brass wires, button pins, chandeliers, candlesticks, paper fabric for fabrication, safety needles, and zippers were also made. Due to the discovery of the frauds the foundry have made, it was shut down in 1990–91. The foundry is no longer active, but the ruins of it remain.

References

External links
 Jornmark (site about abonded places)
http://www.bondandbowery.com/item/13025

Foundries
Industrial buildings in Sweden
Metal companies of Sweden
1653 establishments in Sweden